This is the list of the highest points of the Districts of Kerala

District

See also 

 List of Indian states and union territories by highest point
 List of mountains in Kerala
 List of peaks in the Western Ghats

References 

Landforms of Kerala
Kerala
Kerala geography-related lists